is a city located in Yamanashi Prefecture, Japan. ,  the city had an estimated population of 23,158 in 9987 households, and a population density of 140 persons per km².

Geography
Uenohara is located in the extreme eastern edge of Yamanashi Prefecture, on a fluvial terrace of the Sagami River.
 Mountains: Mount Mikuni, Mount Mitou, Mount Ougi
 Rivers: Sagami River, Tsuru River, Nakama River

Surrounding municipalities
 Yamanashi Prefecture
 Ōtsuki, Tsuru, Dōshi, Kosuge
 Tokyo
 Okutama, Hinohara
 Kanagawa Prefecture
 Sagamihara

Climate
The city has a climate characterized by characterized by hot and humid summers, and relatively mild winters (Köppen climate classification Cfa).  The average annual temperature in Uenohara is 13.4 °C. The average annual rainfall is 1497 mm with September as the wettest month. The temperatures are highest on average in August, at around 25.5 °C, and lowest in January, at around 2.2 °C.

Demographics
Per Japanese census data, the population of Uenohara peaked around the year 2000 and has declined since.

History
The area around present day Uenohara was heavily settled in the Jōmon period, and numerous Jōmon sites have been found within city limits. However, there are fewer Yayoi period sites. During the Nara period ritsuryo organization of Kai Province, the area came under Tsuru County. From the middle of the Kamakura period, much of the province came under the control of the Takeda clan, although as a border area adjacent to the holdings of the Uesugi clan and the Odawara Hōjō clan, it was the location of many skirmishes and battles. During the Edo period, all of Kai Province was tenryō territory under direct control of the Tokugawa shogunate. During this period, the Kōshū Kaidō, one of the Edo Five Routes, passed through Uenohara, which had four of the 45 post stations on that route. The area was also a noted center for sericulture.

After the Meiji restoration, the village of Uenohara was established on December 27, 1897 with the creation of the modern municipalities system. Uenohara became a town on April 1, 1955 ny annexing seven neighboring villages. The modern city of Uenohara was established on February 13, 2005 by the mergers of the former town of Uenohara (from Kitatsuru District), absorbing the village of Akiyama (from Minamitsuru District).

Government
Uenohara has a mayor-council form of government with a directly elected mayor and a unicameral city legislature of 16 members.

Economy
The economy of Uenohara is dominated by agriculture, sericulture and textile manufacturing.

Education
Uenohara  has five public elementary schools and three public junior high schools operated by the city government and one public high school operated by the Yamanashi Prefectural Board of Education. There is also one private high school. The city also hosts the private Teikyo University of Science.
 
 Universities
 Teikyo University of Science
 High Schools
 Uenohara High School
 Japan University Meisei High School
 Middle schools
 Uenohara Middle School
 Akiyama Middle School
 Nishi Middle School
 Primary Schools
 Nishi Elementary School
 Shimada Elementary School
 Uenohara Elementary School
 Saihara Elementary School
 Akiyama Elementary School

Transportation

Railway
 East Japan Railway Company - Chūō Main Line
 –

Highway
  Chūō Expressway

 Kōshū Kaidō

Local attractions
Mushono-Dainembutsu dance (National Important Intangible Folk Cultural Property)

Notable people
Ken Mizorogi, actor

References

External links

Official Website 

 
Cities in Yamanashi Prefecture